Yaniela Arias Álvarez (born 25 April 1998) is a Costa Rican footballer who plays as a midfielder for Dimas Escazú and the Costa Rica women's national team.

Club career
Arias has played for Dimas Escazú in Costa Rica.

International career
Arias represented Costa Rica at the 2014 FIFA U-17 Women's World Cup and the 2018 CONCACAF Women's U-20 Championship. She made her senior debut on 23 February 2021 as a 67th-minute substitution in a 0–0 friendly away draw against Mexico.

References

1998 births
Living people
People from Escazú (canton)
Costa Rican women's footballers
Women's association football midfielders
Costa Rica women's international footballers